François Antoine Léon Fleury was a French landscape painter born in Paris. He was the son of Antoine Claude Fleury, under whom he at first studied, and then under Bertin and Hersent. Between 1827 and 1830 he made a sketching tour in France and the neighbouring countries. He occasionally painted figure subjects, such as The Baptism of Christ, at the church of St. Marguerite, and St. Genevieve, at St. Étienne-du-Mont, Paris. He died in 1858. Amongst his works are:
A View of the Ponte Ratto, Rome. 1831.
Wood in Normandy. (Bar-le-Duc Museum.)
View on the Road to Genoa, near Nice. (Amiens Museum.)
Pasturage in Normandy, near Trouville.
Water and Mill at Coutivert.
View on the Coast of Genoa. (Orléans Museum.)
The Tomb of Caecilia Metella. (National Gallery of Art, Washington)

References
 

1804 births
1858 deaths
French landscape painters
19th-century French painters
French male painters
Painters from Paris
19th-century French male artists